LISP 2 was a programming language proposed in the 1960s as the successor to Lisp. It had largely Lisp-like semantics and Algol 60-like syntax. Today it is mostly remembered for its syntax, but in fact it had many features beyond those of early Lisps.

Early Lisps had many limitations, including limited data types and slow numerics. Its use of fully parenthesized notation was also considered a problem. The inventor of Lisp, John McCarthy, expected these issues to be addressed in a later version, called notionally Lisp 2. Hence the name Lisp 1.5 for the successor to the earliest Lisp.

Lisp 2 was a joint project of the System Development Corporation and Information International, Inc., and was intended for  the IBM built AN/FSQ-32 military computer. Development later shifted to the IBM 360/67 and the Digital Equipment Corporation PDP-6. The project was eventually abandoned.


Bibliography

References

External links
 LISP 2 section of History of LISP at Software Preservation Group
  Paul McJones. The LISP 2 Project. IEEE Annals of the History of Computing, October-December 2017, pages 85-92.

Lisp programming language family